Takaharu Hirozawa (born 16 October 1946) is a sailor from Japan, who represented his country at the 1984 Summer Olympics in Los Angeles, United States as helmsman in the Soling. With crew members Minoru Okita and Takumi Fujiwara they took the 17th place. He also competed at the 1976 Summer Olympics.

References

1946 births
Living people
Sailors at the 1976 Summer Olympics – Finn
Sailors at the 1984 Summer Olympics – Soling
Olympic sailors of Japan
Japanese male sailors (sport)